Condé  is a French place name and personal name. It is ultimately derived from a Celtic word, "Condate", meaning "confluence" (of two rivers) -  from which was derived the Romanised form "Condatum", in use during the Roman period, and thence to the French "Condé" found at various locations.

It may refer to:

People with this surname
Alpha Condé (born 1938), Guinean politician
Benjamin Condé (born 1993), British Pastry Chef
J. M. Condé, early 20th century illustrator
Maryse Condé (born 1937), Guadeloupean author
Miguel Condé (born 1939), Mexican painter
Sékou Condé (born 1993), Guinean footballer

People with this first name 
 Condé Montrose Nast, American publisher

Places
Château de Condé, a private estate in Condé-en-Brie, Aisne, France

Places in France that contain the element Condé
Condé, Indre, in the Indre département
Condé-en-Brie, in the Aisne département
Condé-Folie, in the Somme département
Condé-lès-Autry, in the Ardennes département
Condé-lès-Herpy, in the Ardennes département
Condé-Northen, in the Moselle département
Condé-Sainte-Libiaire, in the Seine-et-Marne département
Condé-sur-Aisne, in the Aisne département
Condé-sur-Huisne, in the Orne département
Condé-sur-Ifs, in the Calvados département
Condé-sur-Iton, in the Eure département
Condé-sur-l'Escaut, in the Nord département
 Siege of Condé (1793)
Condé-sur-Marne, in the Marne département
Condé-sur-Noireau, in the Calvados département
Condé-sur-Risle, in the Eure département
Condé-sur-Sarthe, in the Orne département
Condé-sur-Seulles, in the Calvados département
Condé-sur-Suippe, in the Aisne département
Condé-sur-Vesgre, in the Yvelines département
Condé-sur-Vire, in the Manche département
Celles-lès-Condé, in the Aisne département
La Celle-Condé, in the Cher département
Montigny-lès-Condé, in the Aisne département
Rochy-Condé, in the Oise département
Saint-Christophe-sur-Condé, in the Eure département
Vieux-Condé, in the Nord département

Titles
Louis, Grand Condé (1621-1686), French general
Prince of Condé, a title in the peerage of France, including:
Henri, Prince of Condé (1588–1646)
Louis, Prince of Condé (1530–1569)
Louis, Prince of Condé (1668–1710)
Louis Joseph, Prince of Condé
Princess of Condé, a title in the peerage of France

Other
 Army of Condé, opposing the French Revolution
Condé Nast Publications, an American publisher of periodicals
Condé Nast Traveler, a lifestyle magazine
, an armored cruiser named for the general
 Condé, a famous pink diamond

See also
Conde is a title of Spanish and Portuguese nobility